The 2007 Peel state by-election was held in the Western Australian Legislative Assembly district of Peel on 3 February 2007.

The by-election was triggered by the resignation of Labor MP Norm Marlborough. Labor candidate Paul Papalia was elected to fill the vacancy.

Background

Norm Marlborough was appointed to cabinet in 2006 as Minister for Small Business, Minister for the Peel and the South West, and Minister Assisting the Minister for Education and Training. This followed the replacement of Geoff Gallop by Alan Carpenter as Premier and Labor leader. Carpenter relaxed the previously existing ban on ministerial contact with disgraced former Premier turned lobbyist Brian Burke. Marlborough, a friend of Burke's, would prove an embarrassment to the government when it was revealed by the Corruption and Crime Commission that he had deliberately passed on confidential cabinet information to Burke.

Marlborough resigned from parliament on 10 November 2006, following his sacking from the ministry. On 21 November 2006, the Speaker of the Western Australian Legislative Assembly issued a writ directing the Electoral Commissioner to proceed with an election in the district.

Timeline

Results

Despite the controversy surrounding Marlborough's resignation, the government went unpunished at the ballot box. Instead, the by-election produced an increased two-party preferred majority for Labor.

References

2007 elections in Australia
Western Australian state by-elections
2000s in Western Australia